United Nations Security Council Resolution 165, adopted unanimously on September 26, 1961, after examining the application of Sierra Leone for membership in the United Nations, the Council recommended to the General Assembly that Sierra Leone be admitted.

See also
List of United Nations Security Council Resolutions 101 to 200 (1953–1965)

References
Text of the Resolution at undocs.org

External links
 

 0165
 0165
 0165
1961 in Sierra Leone
September 1961 events